DDY can refer to:
Douglas DC-4 Skymaster, registration PH-DDY, an aircraft owned by the Dutch Dakota Association
The Dudwindi railroad station in India
D.D.Y. Hastanesi, a hospital in İzmir, Turkey that is located in the Alsancak quarter
Musician, Dennis DeYoung.